Martin Joseph "Marty" Barrington (born July 16, 1953) is an American businessman, who has served as Chairman and Chief Executive Officer of Altria Group, Inc, since May 17, 2012 and its President since March 17, 2015. Prior to his appointment as Chief Executive Officer, Martin Barrington's previous positions at the Company have included Vice Chairman, Executive Vice President and Chief Compliance and Administrative Officer. Martin Barrington also serves on the Board of Directors of Anheuser-Busch InBev.

Career
Barrington has been employed continuously by the Altria Group and its subsidiaries in various capacities since 1993. Prior to joining the Altria Group, he practiced law in both the public and private sectors. Other public directorships include Vice Chairman of Altria Group; Executive Vice President and Chief Administrative Officer of Altria Group; Senior Vice President and General Counsel of Philip Morris International and Senior Vice President and General Counsel of Philip Morris USA.

Philanthropy
Barrington previously served on the Board of Commissioners of the Virginia Port Authority and the advisory board of Points of Light Institute. He serves on the boards of trustees of the Virginia Museum of Fine Arts. He also serves on the board of directors of the Richmond Performing Arts Center.

See also

John Middleton Co.
U.S. Smokeless Tobacco Company
Philip Morris USA
Altria

References

Living people
American chief executives
1953 births
Businesspeople from Albany, New York
Albany Law School alumni
Lawyers from Albany, New York